Wilson Selden Washington (September 13, 1889 – July 21, 1953) was a realtor and Democratic member of the Virginia House of Delegates.

Early life and education
Washington was born on September 13, 1889, in Marshall in Fauquier County, Virginia, to Lawrence Washington and Frances Lackland. He was descended from John Augustine Washington, the brother of President George Washington.

The family moved to Alexandria during his childhood. Washington attended the Alexandria Public Schools, then the Bliss Electrical School in Washington, DC. During World War I, Washington enlisted in June 1917 in the United States Army Coast Artillery Corps; he was commissioned a 2nd Lieutenant in November 1918.

Washington married Irene Watkins Tinsley in 1920. They had two children, Wilson Selden Washington, Jr. and Nancy James Washington.

Career and politics
Washington was a member of Grace Episcopal Church in Alexandria, as well as the local Rotary Club. A Freemason, he served as Master of Alexandria-Washington Lodge No. 22. He was also a member of Army Navy Country Club and the Boy Scouts of America and served as President of the Alexandria-Arlington-Fairfax Real Estate Board as well as the Northern Virginia Underwriters Association.

In 1943, Washington was elected to the House of Delegates representing Alexandria and won re-election, serving two terms, succeeded by Armistead L. Boothe.

Death
Washington died on July 21, 1953 in Alexandria.  He is buried at Ivy Hill Cemetery in Alexandria.

References

1889 births
1953 deaths
American Episcopalians
American people of English descent
Burials at Ivy Hill Cemetery (Alexandria, Virginia)
Democratic Party members of the Virginia House of Delegates
Politicians from Alexandria, Virginia
People from Marshall, Virginia
United States Army officers
W. Selden
American military personnel of World War I
American real estate businesspeople